In aquatic biology, the paradox of the plankton describes the situation in which a limited range of resources supports an unexpectedly wide range of plankton species, apparently flouting the competitive exclusion principle which holds that when two species compete for the same resource, one will be driven to extinction.

Ecological paradox
The paradox of the plankton results from the clash between the observed diversity of plankton and the competitive exclusion principle, also known as Gause's law, which states that, when two species compete for the same resource, ultimately only one will persist and the other will be driven to extinction. Coexistence between two such species is impossible because the dominant one will inevitably deplete the shared resources, thus decimating the inferior population. Phytoplankton life is diverse at all phylogenetic levels despite the limited range of resources (e.g. light, nitrate, phosphate, silicic acid, iron) for which they compete amongst themselves.

The paradox of the plankton was originally described in 1961 by G. Evelyn Hutchinson, who proposed that the paradox could be resolved by factors such as vertical gradients of light or turbulence, symbiosis or commensalism, differential predation, or constantly changing environmental conditions. This was supported by later studies which found that the paradox can be resolved by factors such as: zooplankton grazing pressure; chaotic fluid motion; size-selective grazing; spatio-temporal heterogeneity; bacterial mediation; or environmental fluctuations. More generally, some researchers suggest that ecological and environmental factors continually interact such that the planktonic habitat never reaches an equilibrium for which a single species is favoured. In Mitchell et al. (2008), researchers found that small-scale analysis of plankton distribution exhibited patches of aggregation, on the order of 10 cm, that had sufficient lifetimes (> 10 minutes) to enable plankton grazing, competition, and infection.

See also
 Unified neutral theory of biodiversity

References

External links
 The Paradox of the Plankton by Klaus Rohde

Biological interactions
Biological oceanography
Aquatic ecology
Mathematical and theoretical biology
Paradoxes
Planktology